The 1987 Brown Bears football team was an American football team that represented Brown University during the 1987 NCAA Division I-AA football season. Brown finished second in the Ivy League. 

In their fourth season under head coach John Rosenberg, the Bears compiled a 7–3 record but were outscored 160 to 144. Walt Cataldo and Mark Donovan were the team captains. 

The Bears' 5–2 conference record placed second in the Ivy League standings. They outscored Ivy opponents 117 to 97. 

Brown played its home games at Brown Stadium in Providence, Rhode Island.

Schedule

References

Brown
Brown Bears football seasons
Brown Bears football